is a Nintendo Entertainment System video game released in 1990. It is the sequel to Golgo 13: Top Secret Episode.

Plot
A weapons satellite has been snatched out of orbit, and the world is facing nuclear destruction. Behind this act is a group of terrorists known as the Mafat Conspiracy.
The terrorists plan to extort the U.S. and Soviet governments by threatening to make their satellites fall from space. The Mafat are demanding that the Soviets turn over their research on electromagnetic waves, and the American government to give them the Los Angeles, a ship that is equipped with nuclear warheads.

The CIA and KGB are blaming each other, and Golgo 13's mission is to eliminate the leader of the Mafat Revolutionary Group, destroy the Satellite Capture System, and rescue Dr. Barrows. The doctor was kidnapped from his lab in England many years ago and taken to Paris, where he remains in confinement.

Gameplay

The action in this game takes place on five different types of screens: horizontally scrolling action, stationary action, driving a Ferrari, maze navigating, and sniper rifle shooting. The scrolling levels pit the player against a number of enemies, including enemies armed with pistols, machine guns, scythes, boomerangs, grenades, and knives. The player will also face scorpions and dogs. The player is armed with a gun and can pick up extra ammo along the way. The player can also kick enemies.

The stationary screens let the player kick and punch the enemies, which include Arm of Mafat, who is inside the Mafat hideout, Bodyguard, who protects Ahmad Khan, and Canine, who awaits the player at the Mafat base. In addition to fighting enemies in the scrolling and stationary levels (both of which are timed), the player will also do a lot of running and jumping.

The action scenes involving the Ferrari and the maze navigation employ the use of a 3D perspective. The Ferrari portion of the game is a timed race in which the player views the action from behind the car. He can shift gears and throw hand grenades at cars containing agents that are working for the KGB. In the mazes, the player can fire upon pistol-shooting, grenade-throwing and machine gun-toting bad guys while exploring the various hallways and rooms. The player can find extra bullets and an infrared scope that allows night vision.

The Sniper Screen, which makes use of Golgo 13's experience as an assassin, features a close-up of him aiming a gun and in the background a close-up of the target site. When the player is aiming the gun and preparing to fire, the wind speed and direction should be taken into consideration.

Throughout this game, a member of the CIA who goes by the name of James will provide the player with information on the enemies and on the location of Dr. Barrows. He will also provide Golgo 13 with special weapons that the player may request. Agent Sylvia also lends a helping hand.

References

External links

The Mafat Conspiracy instruction booklet

1990 video games
Aicom games
Cold War video games
Golgo 13
Nintendo Entertainment System games
Nintendo Entertainment System-only games
Spy video games
Video game sequels
Video games based on anime and manga
Video games developed in Japan
Video games set in Europe
Vic Tokai games